Equisetum × trachyodon is a nothospecies of Equisetum. Sometimes, it is considered as an individual species: Equisetum trachyodon.

The hybrid formula is Equisetum hyemale L. × Equisetum variegatum Schleich. ex F. Weber & D. Mohr.

Synonyms

Equisetum hiemale var. doellii Milde 
Equisetum hiemale var. trachyodon A.Braun ex Döll 
Equisetum hyemale var. jesupii (A.A.Eat.) Victorin 
Equisetum hyemale var. mackayi Newman 
Equisetum hyemale f. multirameum (S.F.Blake) Vict. 
Equisetum hyemale var. trachyodon (A.K.H.Braun) Döll 
Equisetum hyemale subsp. trachyodon A.Br. 
Equisetum mackaii (Newman) Brichan 
Equisetum mackayi (Newman) Brichan 
Equisetum trachyodon f. fuchsii Geissert 
Equisetum trachyodon f. geminatum (S.F.Blake) M.Broun 
Equisetum trachyodon f. multirameum (S.F.Blake) M.Broun 
Equisetum variegatum var. anglicum Milde 
Equisetum variegatum var. concolor Milde 
Equisetum variegatum var. continentale Milde 
Equisetum variegatum f. geminatum S.F.Blake 
Equisetum variegatum var. jesupii A.A.Eat. ex Gilbert 
Equisetum variegatum f. multirameum S.F.Blake 
Equisetum variegatum var. trachyodon (A.K.H.Braun) J.D.Hooker fil. 
Hippochaete fuchsii (Geissert) H.P.Fuchs & Geissert 
Hippochaete hyemalis var. jesupii (A.A.Eat.) Farw. 
Hippochaete trachyodon (A.Br.) Boern.
Hippochaete variegata var. jesupii (A.A.Eat.) Farw.

References

External links

trachyodon
Plant nothospecies